Hassan Ebadi (Persian:  حسن عبادی; born 1986) is an Iranian Strongman, competing for Iran in international strongman competitions.

He participated four times (2008–2011) in Iran's Strongest Man competition, and could become the Runner-up in 2008.

See also
Iran's Strongest Man
World Strongman Cup Federation

References

External links
قويترين مردان جهان در قشم فاقد اعتبار قانوني است

1986 births
Living people
Iranian powerlifters
Iranian strength athletes